Pequannock may refer to the following in the U.S. state of New Jersey:

Pequannock River, a tributary of the Pompton River
Pequannock Township, New Jersey, a township in Morris County
Pequannock Township School District
Pequannock Township High School

See also
Pequonnock River, in Connecticut